N K Raghupathy is an Indian Administrative Service Officer from the 1975 cadre. He retired from Indian Administrative Service in 2013. With 40 years of service, teaching and research, he worked in West Bengal Secretariat and  Government of India secretariat and finally as chairman of Staff Selection Commission from 2009 to 2013. His stint at SSC was widely lauded by job-seekers in India. He interacted with the candidates through his Twitter Account and addressed grievances on a regular basis. Besides, he has an interactive Facebook Page where he used to share his valuable experiences during his service tenure as well as address the candidates who were appearing in examinations conducted by Staff Selection Commission.

References

Press Information Bureau news item <http://www.pib.nic.in/newsite/erelease.aspx?relid=48560>

Living people
Year of birth missing (living people)